Alex Timbers (born August 7, 1978) is an American writer and director and the recipient of Tony, Golden Globe, Drama Desk, Outer Critics Circle, and London Evening Standard Awards, as well as two OBIE and Lucile Lortel Awards. He also received the 2019 Drama League Founder's Award for Excellence in Directing and the 2016 Jerome Robbins Award for Directing. He was nominated for a 2020 Grammy Award. For his work on Moulin Rouge! The Musical, Timbers won a 2021 Tony Award for Best Director of a Musical.

His Broadway credits include Moulin Rouge! The Musical, Beetlejuice, American Utopia, Oh Hello! On Broadway, Rocky, Peter and the Starcatcher, The Pee-wee Herman Show, and Bloody Bloody Andrew Jackson.

His Off-Broadway credits include David Byrne and Fatboy Slim's Here Lies Love, for which he won the 2014 Lucille Lortel Award for Best Director and the London Evening Standard Award, and The Robber Bridegroom, which won the 2016 Lucille Lortel Award for Best Revival.

For TV, Timbers directed and executive produced John Mulaney: Kid Gorgeous at Radio City and Ben Platt Live from Radio City Music Hall, both for Netflix. He is a co-creator of the Amazon series Mozart in the Jungle which won the 2016 Golden Globe Award for Best Television Series - Musical or Comedy. Oh Hello! on Broadway was filmed for Netflix, and The Pee-wee Herman Show was filmed for HBO and received an Emmy nomination.

His debut picture book, Broadway Bird, was published by Feiwel and Friends, an imprint of Macmillan, on May 24, 2022.

Background
Timbers grew up in New York City. When he was 15, he moved to Illinois and attended Lake Forest High School. He then went to Yale University where he graduated magna cum laude. While at Yale, he was a member of the improvisational comedy group The Viola Question and president of the Yale Dramatic Association.

Broadway
Timbers served as the second assistant director on the Broadway premiere of Jersey Boys in 2005.

In 2010, Bloody Bloody Andrew Jackson opened at the Public Theater to rave reviews with Timbers directing. The show was co-written by Timbers and Michael Friedman. It returned to the Public the following year, extended three times, and became the second highest-grossing show in the institution's history. It transferred to the Bernard B. Jacobs Theatre on Broadway on September 20, 2010. The show won a Lucille Lortel Award, an Outer Critics Circle Award, and a Broadway.com Award for Best Musical. Timbers won a Drama Desk Award for Best Book of a Musical and was nominated for a Tony Award for his book, as well as an Outer Critics Circle Award for his direction.

In March 2011, Timbers co-directed with Roger Rees Peter and the Starcatcher for Disney at New York Theatre Workshop. The show opened to a positive review from Ben Brantley in The New York Times, and Timbers won the 2011 Obie Award for Direction. The production was the fastest-selling show in New York Theatre Workshop's history and extended three times. In March 2012, Timbers and Rees co-directed Peter and the Starcatcher on Broadway. It was subsequently nominated for nine Tony Awards and won five. The show spawned two national tours and a year-long return engagement Off-Broadway.

In 2014, Timbers directed Rocky, based on the Oscar-winning film, on Broadway at the Winter Garden Theatre, for which he was nominated for Drama Desk and Outer Critics Circle Awards for Best Director. Two years earlier, he directed a pilot production of the show in Germany, which ran for five years in Hamburg and Stuttgart.

In 2016, Timbers directed the comedy Oh Hello! on Broadway, written by and starring Nick Kroll and John Mulaney. The show opened to positive reviews, recouped its capitalization, and was filmed for Netflix.

In 2018, Timbers directed the out-of-town tryout of Beetlejuice at the National Theater in Washington DC. The next year, he directed the Broadway premiere of Beetlejuice at the Winter Garden Theater. The show was nominated for eight 2019 Tony Awards, including Best Musical. The show made its international debut in South Korea at the Sejong Arts Center, staged and designed by the original Broadway creative team, in July 2021. It was nominated for 10 Korea Musical Awards, including Best Musical.

In 2018, Timbers also directed the out-of-town tryout of Moulin Rouge! The Musical, based on the Oscar-winning film, at the Emerson Colonial Theater in Boston. In July 2019, he again directed the show on Broadway at the Al Hirschfeld Theater. The following year, the production was nominated for 14 Tony Awards including Best Musical. For his work on the production, Timbers was nominated for Best Director of a Musical and, for his work on the cast album, he was nominated for a 2020 Grammy Award. The show also won Best Musical at the 2020 Outer Critics Circle Awards and the 2020 Drama League Awards, and Timbers won the 2020 Outer Critics Circle Award for Best Director of a Musical.

In September 2019, Timbers served as Production Consultant on David Byrne's American Utopia at the Emerson Colonial Theater in Boston. The next month, the show opened on Broadway at the Hudson Theater. American Utopia was called "the best live show of all time" by NME Magazine. The show recouped and was named to many critics' year-end top ten lists. The show was filmed for HBO by director Spike Lee and was nominated for six Emmy Awards.

In September 2021, Moulin Rouge! The Musical re-opened on Broadway and won 10 Tony Awards, including Best Musical. For his work on the production, Timbers won a 2021 Tony Award for Best Director of a Musical. That same month, American Utopia also re-opened on Broadway and received a 2021 Special Tony Award.

On November 12, 2021, Moulin Rouge! The Musical began performances simultaneously in Melbourne at the Regent Theatre and in London's West End at the Piccadilly Theatre. In May 2022, the Australian production opened in Sydney. In April 2022, Timbers directed the first national tour of Moulin Rouge! The Musical, which opened in Chicago at the James M. Nederlander Theatre. In October 2022, the German production of Moulin Rouge! The Musical opened in Cologne and in December 2022 the Korean production opened in Seoul, both directed by Timbers.

In April 2022, Beetlejuice re-opened on Broadway, now at the Marquis Theater. In November 2022, Timbers directed the first national tour of Beetlejuice, which premiered at San Francisco's Golden Gate Theater.

Sardi's Restaurant honored Timbers by unveiling a portrait of him for their famed wall of caricatures on July 20, 2022.

Off-Broadway
For Gutenberg! The Musical!, Timbers was nominated for a Drama Desk Award for Best Director of a Musical. For Hell House, Timbers was nominated for a Drama Desk Award for Outstanding Theatrical Experience. His production of Dixie's Tupperware Party was nominated for a Drama Desk Award for Outstanding Solo Performance. Timbers conceived and directed A Very Merry Unauthorized Children's Scientology Pageant, for which he and writer Kyle Jarrow won an Obie Award.  Timbers also won two Garland Awards for the subsequent Los Angeles production, and his 2006 revival was heralded by The New York Times as the "Best Revival of the Year."

In August 2013, Timbers and Bloody Bloody Andrew Jackson composer Michael Friedman reunited for a musical version of the play Love's Labour's Lost that appeared as part of Shakespeare in the Park at the Delacorte Theatre. It was nominated for a 2014 Drama Desk Award for Best Musical.

In 2013 and again in 2014, Timbers directed Here Lies Love at the Public Theater in New York City, an immersive club musical about Imelda Marcos featuring the music of David Byrne and Fatboy Slim, for which he won the Lucille Lortel Award for Best Director. The show was extended at the Public Theater three times, becoming the second-longest running show in the theater's history, and made numerous year-end Best Of lists including The New York Times, The New York Post, The New York Daily News, Time, The Hollywood Reporter, Time Out, New York Magazine, and Vogue. He was also nominated for Drama Desk and Outer Critics Circle Awards for Best Director.

In 2014, Timbers directed Here Lies Love at the National Theatre in London. Timbers, Byrne, and Fatboy Slim won the London Evening Standard Beyond Theatre Award "for pushing the boundaries of musicals."

In 2016, Timbers directed a revival of The Robber Bridegroom for Roundabout Theater Company, which won the 2016 Lucille Lortel Award for Best Revival.

Les Freres Corbusier
Between 2003 and 2015, Timbers served as the Artistic Director of the award-winning, experimental theater company Les Freres Corbusier. Les Freres productions included Boozy..., Dance Dance Revolution, Bloody Bloody Andrew Jackson, Hell House, Heddatron, and Hoover Comes Alive!.

Filmography
Ben Platt Live from Radio City Music Hall - Co-Director, Executive Producer
John Mulaney: Kid Gorgeous at Radio City - Director, Executive Producer
Oh Hello! On Broadway - Staging Director, Executive Producer
Mozart in the Jungle - Co-creator, Co-Executive Producer, Writer
The Pee-wee Herman Show - Staging Director

He is a co-creator with Jason Schwartzman, Roman Coppola, and Paul Weitz of the Amazon Studios series Mozart in the Jungle. He served as Co-Executive Producer on all episodes.

For John Mulaney: Kid Gorgeous at Radio City, Mulaney won the Primetime Emmy Award for Outstanding Writing for a Variety Special in 2018. John Mulaney: Kid Gorgeous at Radio City currently holds a 100% Rotten Tomatoes score.

Books
Timbers' debut picture book, Broadway Bird, set in an all-animal version of Broadway, was published by Feiwel and Friends, an imprint of Macmillan, on May 24, 2022.

Awards and nominations

References

External links

Living people
American theatre directors
Place of birth missing (living people)
Yale University alumni
American dramatists and playwrights
1978 births
Tony Award winners